Elisa Carrillo Cabrera (born 1981) is a Mexican classical ballet dancer. She is a co-director of the Mexican National Dance Company and principal dancer with the Berlin State Ballet (since 2011).

Early life and training 
Carrillo was born in Texcoco, State of Mexico, and attended the  Escuela de iniciación artística número 1, Instituto Nacional de Bellas Artes y Literatura between 1988 and 1990, when she began study at the Escuela Nacional de Danza Clásica y Contemporánea, Instituto Nacional de Bellas Artes y Literatura. In 1997, Carrillo moved to the United Kingdom, enrolling at the English National Ballet School until 1999. She was designed a Master of Ballet by the Ministry of Culture of the Federal Republic of Germany, after she completed training at the John Cranko Schule Stuttgart, Germany between 2001 and 2003.

Professional career 
Carrillo joined the Stuttgart Ballet in 1999 as a member of the corps de ballet. Prior to leaving the troupe in 2007, she was named a soloist. Following her departure from the Stuttgart Ballet, Carrillo joined the Berlin State Ballet as a demi-soloist, becoming principal dancer in 2011.

She is the artistic director of Sir Anton Dolin Foundation.

Carrillo founded the Elisa Carrillo Cabrera Foundation to allow other Mexican dancers opportunities to train abroad, and host an annual gala called Elisa y Amigos.

In 2019, she won the Prix Benois de la Danse for Juliet in Nacho Duato's Romeo and Juliet. Carrillo is the second Mexican dancer to be awarded the Benois, after Isaac Hernández won it the previous year. She is also the first Latin American woman to win.

Carrillo has made guest appearances in Paris, Japan, China, USA, Korea, Italy, Cairo, Switzerland, Singapore, Bangkok, Hong Kong and Luxembourg.

Select repertoire
Carrillo's repertoire includes:

Awards 
 Gold medal and scholarship to study in London Instituto Nacional de Bellas Artes y Literatura, FONCA and English National Ballet School 
 Best Duet Award (with Mikhail) at the XII International Ballet Festival Dance Open St Petersburg
 Prix Benois de la Danse 2019
 "Soul of dance" 2019 from the  Ministry of Culture of the Russian Federation and the editors of the  magazine "Ballet"

Personal life 
Carrillo is married to Mikhail Kaniskin, a fellow principal dancer with Berlin State Ballet.

References

External links 
 
 Berlin State Ballet ensemble
 Danzatlan
 Pointe Magazine interview, January 2019

1981 births
Living people
Mexican ballerinas
21st-century Mexican dancers
People from Texcoco, State of Mexico
21st-century ballet dancers
Mexican expatriates in Germany
Mexican expatriates in the United Kingdom
Prima ballerinas
Prix Benois de la Danse winners